The Church of the Missione ai Vergini is a church at 51 via Vergini in the historic centre of Naples, not far from the National Archaeological Museum of Naples.

The Congregation of the Mission first set up a base in Naples in the 16th century, initially at Santa Maria dei Vergini, with a monastery alongside, thanks to a donation by the duchess of Sant'Elia, Marie-Josèphe de Brandis-Staremberg. In the 18th century they built a new monastery and church, under the supervision of Father Gargiani and to designs by Luigi Vanvitelli. These were begun in 1724 but only completed in 1760, with the facade (designed by an unknown architect) remaining incomplete until 1788. The building was damaged in the bombardment of Naples in 1943 and restored after the war.

References

Churches in Naples
Baroque church buildings in Naples
Vincentian monasteries
Buildings and structures completed in 1760
Luigi Vanvitelli buildings
18th-century architecture in Italy